Donna Corcoran (born September 29, 1942) is an American former child actress who appeared in nine Hollywood films from 1951 through 1955. She notably appeared in two aquatic musicals that featured Esther Williams (playing swimmer Annette Kellerman as a child in one of them), and as a vulnerable girl being victimized by an emotionally disturbed babysitter (played by Marilyn Monroe) in Don't Bother to Knock.

After making her last film, she made a token comeback as a young adult in an episode of the long-running sitcom My Three Sons (starring Fred MacMurray) in the early 1960s.

Corcoran was born in Quincy, Massachusetts to William Henry Corcoran, Sr. and Kathleen H. McKenney. Several of her siblings were child stars, including younger sister Noreen Corcoran, Kevin Anthony Corcoran, and Kelly Corcoran.

Personal life 
Corcoran married Luis Felipe Guerrero Newman, a rancher, in 1961; they had two daughters and later divorced. She married mining engineer Jerry Keene in 1981, and they remained married until his death in 2017.

Filmography

References

Bibliography
 Best, Marc. Those Endearing Young Charms: Child Performers of the Screen (South Brunswick and New York: Barnes & Co., 1971), pp. 45–49.

External links

1942 births
Living people
American film actresses
American child actresses
American television actresses
People from Greater Los Angeles
People from Quincy, Massachusetts
21st-century American women